Czech Republic  competed at the World Games 2017 in Wroclaw, Poland, from 20 July 2017 to 30 July 2017.

Competitors

Sport Climbing
Czech Republic has qualified at the 2017 World Games:

Men's Speed - Libor Hroza

Nations at the 2017 World Games
2017 in Czech sport
2017